Marko Anttila (born May 27, 1985) is a Finnish professional ice hockey forward for Oulun Kärpät in the Finnish Liiga. Anttila was selected by Chicago Blackhawks in the 9th round (260th overall) of the 2004 NHL Entry Draft. His nickname among his teammates is "Stretch" ("Stretsi" in Finnish), which was given to him by Steve Kariya due to his large physical stature, but among the Finnish fans, he is more commonly known as "Mörkö".

Playing career
Marko Anttila played his first senior-level ice hockey games during the 2003–04 season. Anttila's first team was his hometown team Lempäälän Kisa of Lempäälä.

Anttila scored 38 points in 22 Suomi-sarja regular season games during his debut season. Though playing at the 3rd highest level in Finland, Anttila was drafted by the Chicago Blackhawks in the 2004 NHL Entry Draft while he was playing for LeKi. It is believed that Anttila's connections with Chicago's scout for Finland, Sakari Pietilä, was the reason why he was drafted. His large size (over 6'8 ft tall) combined with his hard slap shot was the most convincing factors that influenced Sakari Pietilä to suggest him to the Blackhawks.

After being drafted while playing for a small town's team, Anttila soon was reckoned as a player to invest in. Marko Anttila was contracted by Ilves in 2004. Anttila struggled during his first season in SM-liiga but soon got the hang of playing at higher levels.

In 2007–08, Anttila scored his SM-liiga career-high when he racked up 23 points in 56 games, and he was selected to play for the Finnish National team during the European Hockey Tour.

On 26 April 2011, Anttila made a one-year contract with TPS. In June 2013, it was announced that Anttila would join Metallurg Novokuznetsk of the KHL.

After parts of three seasons with Örebro HK of the Swedish Hockey League, Anttila returned to the KHL, linking up on a one-year deal with Finnish-based club, Jokerit on 20 April 2016.

During the 2016–17 season, having added a physical presence to the checking lines, Anttila agreed to a two-year contract extension to remain with Jokerit on 8 January 2017.

Anttila remained with Jokerit for six years before the club's withdrawal to the KHL before the playoffs in the 2021–22 season due to the Russian invasion of Ukraine. He subsequently joined his original Finnish club, Ilves of the Liiga, on 28 February 2022, for the remainder of the campaign.

On 16 June 2022, it was announced that Anttila has signed for Oulun Kärpät for the 2022/23 season.

International play

In 2019, Anttila served as captain when Finland won their third gold medal in the Ice Hockey World Championships. He scored the only goal in the semi-final game against Russia. In the final against Canada, he scored two goals, including the game-winning goal leading Finland to a 3–1 victory.

Career statistics

Regular season and playoffs

International

References

External links

1985 births
Living people
Ariada Volzhsk players
Chicago Blackhawks draft picks
Finnish ice hockey right wingers
Ilves players
Jokerit players
Lempäälän Kisa players
Metallurg Novokuznetsk players
Örebro HK players
People from Lempäälä
HC TPS players
Ice hockey players at the 2018 Winter Olympics
Ice hockey players at the 2022 Winter Olympics
Olympic ice hockey players of Finland
Medalists at the 2022 Winter Olympics
Olympic gold medalists for Finland
Olympic medalists in ice hockey
Sportspeople from Pirkanmaa